For 1985 in television, see:

1985 in Albanian television
1985 in American television
1985 in Australian television
1985 in Austrian television
1985 in Belgian television
1985 in Brazilian television
1985 in British television
1985 in Canadian television
1985 in Croatian television
1985 in Czech television
1985 in Danish television
1985 in Dutch television
1985 in Estonian television
1985 in French television
1985 in German television
1985 in Irish television
1985 in Israeli television
1985 in Japanese television
1985 in New Zealand television
1985 in Norwegian television
1985 in Portuguese television
1985 in Philippine television
1985 in Scottish television
1985 in Singapore television
1985 in South African television
1985 in Swedish television